Paul Ryan (June 11, 1945 – April 23, 2015), born Bernard Paul Feldman, was an American actor, producer and television personality. His television roles included bit parts in Bewitched, Emergency!, Mission: Impossible, Night Court, Murder, She Wrote and Desperate Housewives. His film appearances include Coma (1978), The Promise (1979), Star 80 (1983), and Fast Forward (1985).

Ryan also worked as a correspondent for Entertainment Tonight and KTLA Morning News.

Death
Ryan died at the Providence Saint Joseph Medical Center in Burbank, California of leukemia in 2015, aged 69.

Partial filmography
Butterflies Are Free (1972) – Man in Mod Shop (uncredited)
Coma (1978) – 1st Technician
Starhops (1978) – Norman
The Promise (1979) – Doctor Fenton
The Last Word (1979) – Denise's Date
Charlie Chan and the Curse of the Dragon Queen (1981) – Masten
Star 80 (1983) – Radio Interviewer
Fast Forward (1985) – Staffer
High Strung (1991) – Game Show Host

References

External links

1945 births
2015 deaths
Deaths from cancer in California
Deaths from leukemia
20th-century American male actors
21st-century American male actors
American male television actors
American male film actors
Male actors from Philadelphia